The term Aznar government may refer to:

Aznar I Government, the government of Spain under José María Aznar from 1996 to 2000.
Aznar II Government, the government of Spain under José María Aznar from 2000 to 2004.